Belo Horizonte is an album by John McLaughlin, released in 1981 through Warner Music Group. The album reached number 172 on the Billboard 200 and number 11 on Billboards Jazz Albums chart.

The album features McLaughlin on acoustic guitar, although the backing band includes electric keyboards. The same basic lineup would return on his next album Music Spoken Here. It is the first McLaughlin album including Katia Labèque, who would become his wife.

Track listing
All tracks by John McLaughlin, except where noted.

 "Belo Horizonte" – 4:28
 "La Baleine" – 5:58
 "Very Early (Homage to Bill Evans)" (Evans, McLaughlin) – 1:12
 "One Melody" – 6:27
 "Stardust on Your Sleeve" – 6:03
 "Waltz for Katia" – 3:26
 "Zamfir" – 5:47
 "Manitas d'Oro (For Paco de Lucia)" – 4:13

 Personnel 
 Tommy Campbell - drums & percussion 
 Jean Paul Celea – bass guitar, acoustic bass
 François Couturier – Fender Rhodes electric piano, synthesizers
 Jean-Pierre Drouet – percussions
 Augustin Dumay – violin, vocal
 François Jeanneau – tenor & soprano saxophones
 Katia Labèque – piano, synthesizer
 Paco de Lucía – acoustic guitar
 John McLaughlin – acoustic, electric & baritone guitars
 Steve Sheman – percussionProduction:'
 George Marino – mastering engineer
 Laurent Peyron – engineer 
 Jean Louis Rizet – engineer

Chart performance

References

1981 albums
John McLaughlin (musician) albums
Warner Music Group albums